The Best of Jim Diamond is a compilation album of tracks from Scottish singer-songwriter Jim Diamond's first two solo albums Double Crossed and Desire for Freedom, along with B-sides.

Both of Diamond's major UK top ten hits "I Should Have Known Better", and "Hi Ho Silver" appear, although it does not feature his other major hit and signature song "I Won't Let You Down" which he previously recorded with Ph.D.

Track listing
"I Should Have Known Better"  4.07
"Young Love (Carry Me Away)"  4.35
"Remember I Love You"  4.05
"Desire"  4.50
"I Sleep Alone at Night"  5.00
"Double Crossed"  3.51
"Impossible Dream"  4.27
"I'm Yours"  4.55
"Rock 'n' Roll"  3.17
"Caledonia"  5.10
"So Strong"  3.48
"Blue Songs"  3.25
"You'll Go Crazy"  4.22
"Together"  4.19
"My Weakness is You"  5.05
"I Can't Stop"  4.31
"Stumblin' Over"  4.09
"Hi Ho Silver"  4.11

Jim Diamond (singer) albums
1999 compilation albums
Polydor Records compilation albums